37432 Piszkéstető, provisional designation , is an Erigonian asteroid from the inner regions of the asteroid belt, approximately  in diameter. It was discovered on 11 January 2002, by the Hungarian astronomers Krisztián Sárneczky and Zsuzsanna Heiner at the Konkoly Observatory's Piszkéstető Station northeast of Budapest, Hungary. The asteroid was later named for the discovering observatory.

Orbit and classification 

Piszkéstető is a member of the Erigone family of asteroids. It orbits the Sun in the inner main-belt at a distance of 2.0–2.8 AU once every 3 years and 8 months (1,342 days). Its orbit has an eccentricity of 0.17 and an inclination of 5° with respect to the ecliptic.

The body's observation arc begins 7 years prior to its official discovery observation, with a precovery taken by the Steward Observatory's Spacewatch survey at Kitt Peak in March 1995.

Naming 

The station belongs to the Konkoly Observatory in Budapest. The approved naming citation was published by the Minor Planet Center on 4 May 2004.

Physical characteristics 

According to the survey carried out by NASA's Wide-field Infrared Survey Explorer with its subsequent NEOWISE mission, Piszkéstető measures 4.6 kilometers in diameter and its surface has a low albedo of 0.051, which is typical for C-type asteroids. The results agree with a generic absolute magnitude-to-diameter conversion for an assumed albedo of 0.05 and an absolute magnitude of 15.6.

Lightcurves 

As of 2018, the asteroid's composition, shape and rotation period remain unknown.

References

External links 
 Piszkéstető Station
 Asteroid Lightcurve Database (LCDB), query form (info )
 Dictionary of Minor Planet Names, Google books
 Asteroids and comets rotation curves, CdR – Observatoire de Genève, Raoul Behrend
 Discovery Circumstances: Numbered Minor Planets (35001)-(40000) – Minor Planet Center
 
 

037432
Discoveries by Krisztián Sárneczky
Discoveries by Zsuzsanna Heiner
Named minor planets
20020111